The Kaapvaal Craton (centred on Limpopo Province in South Africa), along with the Pilbara Craton of Western Australia, are the only remaining areas of pristine 3.6–2.5 Ga (billion years ago) crust on Earth. Similarities of rock records from both these cratons, especially of the overlying late Archean sequences, suggest that they were once part of the Vaalbara supercontinent.

Description
To the south and west, the Kaapvaal Craton is flanked by Proterozoic orogens, and to the east by the Lebombo monocline that contains Jurassic igneous rocks associated with the break-up of Gondwana.

The Kaapvaal Craton formed and stabilised between 3.7 and 2.6 Ga by the emplacement of major granitoid batholiths that thickened and stabilised the continental crust during the early stages of an arc-related magmatism and sedimentation cycle. The craton is a mixture of early Archean (3.0–3.5 Ga) granite greenstone terranes and older tonalitic gneisses (ca. 3.6–3.7 Ga), intruded by a variety of granitic plutons (3.3–3.0 Ga). Subsequent evolution of the Kaapvaal Craton (3.0–2.7 Ga) is thought to be associated with continent–arc collision that caused an overlaying succession of basins filled with thick sequences of both volcanic and sedimentary rocks. This was then followed by episodic extension and rifting when the Gaborone–Kanye and Ventersdorp sequences were developed. Early Archean crust is well exposed only on the east side of the craton and comprises a collage of subdomains and crustal blocks characterised by distinctive igneous rocks and deformations. 
 
The belt is an east-northeast trending zone of granulite facies tectonites that separates the granitoid-greenstone terranes of the Kaapvaal and Zimbabwe cratons.

Limpopo Central Zone
The crustal evolution of the Limpopo Central Zone can be summarised into three main periods: 3.2–2.9 Ga, 2.6 Ga, and 2.0 Ga. The first two periods are characterised by magmatic activity leading to the formation of Archaean Tonalite-Trondhjemite-Granodiorite (TTG) such as the Sand River Gneisses and the Bulai Granite intrusion. Early Proterozoic high-grade metamorphic conditions produced partial melting that formed large amounts of granitic melt.

There is no indication that the Neoarchean to early Paleoproterozoic succession on the craton were sourced from the 2.65–2.70 Ga orogenic event preserved in the Limpopo Metamorphic Complex. However, younger late-Paleoproterozoic red bed successions contain zircons of this time interval as well as many ~2.0 Ga detrital zircons. This implies that the Limpopo Complex together with the Zimbabwe Craton only became attached to the Kaapvaal Craton at approximately 2.0 Ga during formation of the Magondi Mobile Belt which in turn sourced the voluminous late Paleoproterozoic red beds of southern Africa. Evidence of the horizontal layering and riverine erosion can be found throughout the Waterberg Massif within the Limpopo Central Zone.

Barberton greenstone belt

The Barberton greenstone belt, also known as the Makhonjwa Mountains, is situated on the eastern edge of Kaapvaal Craton. It is well known for its gold mineralisation and for its Komatiites, an unusual type of ultramafic volcanic rock named after the Komati River that flows through the belt. Some of the oldest exposed rocks on Earth (greater than 3.6 Ga) are located in the Barberton greenstone belt of the Eswatini–Barberton areas and these contain some of the oldest traces of life on earth. Only the rocks found in the Isua Greenstone Belt of Western Greenland are older.

Johannesburg Dome
The Archaean Johannesburg Dome is located in the central part of the Kaapvaal Craton and consists of trondhjemitic and tonalitic granitic rocks intruded into mafic-ultramafic greenstone. Studies using U-Pb single zircon dating for granitoid samples yield an age of 3340 +/- 3 Ma and represents the oldest granitoid phase recognised so far. "Following the trondhjemite-tonalite gneiss emplacement a further period of magmatism took place on the dome, which resulted in the intrusion of mafic dykes that are manifest as hornblende amphibolites. The age of these dykes has yet to be determined quantitatively, but they fall within the time constraints imposed by the age of the trondhjemitic gneisses (3340–3200 Ma) and later, crosscutting, potassic granitoids.

These rocks consisting mainly of granodiorites constitute the third magmatic event and occupy an area of batholithic dimensions extending across most of the southern portion of the dome. The southern and southeastern parts of the batholith consist mainly of medium-grained, homogeneous, grey granodiorites dated at 3121 +/- 5 Ma....The data, combined with that from other parts of the Kaapvaal craton, further supports the view that the evolution of the craton was long-lived and episodic, and that it grew by accretionary processes, becoming generally younger to the north and west of the ca. 3.5 Ga Barberton- Eswatini granite-greenstone terrane situated in the southeastern part of the craton."

See also

References

Bibliography 
 Glikson, A. and Vickers, J. (2006) "The 3.26–3.24 Ga Barberton asteroid impact cluster: Tests of tectonic and magmatic consequences, Pilbara Craton, Western Australia", Earth and Planetary Science Letters, 241 (1–2), 11–20, 
 Louzda, K.L. (2003) "The magmatic evolution of the upper ~3450 Ma Hooggenoeg Formation, Barberton greenstone belt, Kaapvaal Craton, South Africa", Utrecht University : unpubl. MSc project abstr.
 Poujol, M., Robb, L.J., Anhaeusser, C.R. and Gericke, B. (2003) "A review of the geochronological constraints on the evolution of the Kaapvaal Craton, South Africa", Precambrian Research, 127 (1–3), 181–213, .
 Westraat, J.D, Kisters, A.F.M., Poujo, M. and Stevens, G. (2005) "Transcurrent shearing, granite sheeting and the incremental construction of the tabular 3.1 Ga Mpuluzi batholith, Barberton granite–greenstone terrane, South Africa", Journal of the Geological Society, 162 (2), 373–388, 
 Yearron, L.M., Clemens, J.D., Stevens, G. and Anhaeusser, C.R.(2003) "Geochemistry and Petrogenesis of the Granitoids of the Barberton Mountainlan, South Africa", Geophysical Research Abstracts, 5, 02639

Archean Africa
Cratons
Geology of South Africa